Nelson–Pettis Farmsteads Historic District, also known as Poverty Hill, is a national historic district located at St. Joseph, Missouri. The district encompasses four contributing buildings, three contributing sites, and one contributing structure on two adjoining
farmsteads - the Nelson farmstead and the Pettis farmstead. The contributing resources are the Nelson I-house farmhouse ( 1871), root cellar (c. 1871), the Nelson family cemetery (c. 1854), the Pettis farmhouse (c. 1915), the barn (c. 1910), the corn crib / shed (c. 1900), and the agricultural fields (c. 1847-1849).

It was listed on the National Register of Historic Places in 1995.

References

Historic districts on the National Register of Historic Places in Missouri
Farms on the National Register of Historic Places in Missouri
Historic districts in St. Joseph, Missouri
National Register of Historic Places in Buchanan County, Missouri